Caloptilia aeolospila is a moth of the family Gracillariidae. It is known from China (Yunnan).

References

aeolospila
Moths of Asia
Moths described in 1938